The 1999 BMW Open was a men's tennis tournament played on Clay courts in Munich, Germany that was part of the World Series of the 1999 ATP Tour. It was the eighty-third edition of the tournament and was held from April 26 – May 3.

Thomas Enqvist was the defending champion, but lost in the first round this year.

Franco Squillari won the title, defeating Andrei Pavel 6–4, 6–3 in the final.

Seeds

Draw

Finals

Top half

Bottom half

References

Singles
Singles